X-Polynation/Book of Flags is a two-song EP by Q and Not U, recorded at Inner Ear Studios in June 2003 and released in September 2003 by Dischord Records. It can be found on both CD and 7" formats.  Photography by Shawn Brackbill.

Track listing
 "X-Polynation"
 "Book of Flags"

Q and Not U albums
2003 EPs
Dischord Records EPs